Ashley Stymest (born 31 July 1991), better known by Ash Stymest, is an English male model, actor and musician.

Career
Stymest was brought up in Coney Hall. He attended first Charles Darwin School, and then Ravens Wood School, in London Borough of Bromley. His modelling career started after being recruited by Hedi Slimane in 2008. He was scouted while skateboarding through the streets of Camden when he was seventeen. That same year, he was photographed by Slimane for the cover of Japanese Vogue Hommes, his first appearance on a magazine cover.  

Stymest has appeared on the cover of international magazines and various fashion shows. He has worked with famous fashion designers, such as John Galliano, Karl Lagerfeld, Moschino, Saint Laurent, and Alexander McQueen among others. He has appeared in the campaigns for Dr. Martens, Esprit, Topman, H&M, Pringle of Scotland, and more. He had his portrait painted by film director and painter Gus Van Sant.

From 2010 to 2011, Stymest presented a show on MTV UK called MTV Bang. Stymest started playing music since he was 12 and he was a member of the group of Mannequins, but later founded his own band Bones, where he played the drums. He also started to write music for other artists. In 2011, Stymest recorded an album with his band. In 2014, Stymest was featured in the Korean girl group, 2NE1's music video, "Gotta Be You". 

In 2015, Stymest signed with modelling agency The Lions NY. He was next managed by production and management company for directors, writers, actors and comedians Anonymous Content as well as by the Curtis Brown Group. Later on, Stymest discovered model Simone "Slick Wood" Thompson and helped launch her fashion career.

Stymest next starred opposite Hafsia Herzi, in a French independent film Sex Doll (Amoureux Solitaires), directed by Sylvie Verheyde. The film was released in December 2016. 

In December 2018, Stymest signed a record deal with Interscope Records North America and Universal International with his first EP set to be released in 2019. In April 2019, he signed with a Malaysian artist agency Rocketfuel Entertainment who will be handling his music career in the Asian region.

In 2021 Stymest starred in Phobias alongside Hana Mae Lee (Pitch Perfect), Macy Gray (Training Day, Spider-Man) and Leonardo Nam (Westworld) The movie was released to positive reviews.

Personal life 
Stymest married model Maille Stymest in 2011. They have one daughter together. They divorced in 2013. In 2014, it was rumoured he was in a relationship with former 2NE1 member and rapper, CL and had her real name tattooed on his wrist but neither of them addressed their relationship. He also dated actress Lily-Rose Depp from 2016 to 2018.

Filmography

Film

Music video appearances

Variety show

Discography

Digital single

References

External links
 Models.com
Instagram account

1991 births
Living people
English male models